A gradonachalnik was —in the Russian Empire of the 19th and early 20th century— an official with the rights of governor who controlled a gradonachalstvo (a city with the adjacent land), independent of the provincial subdivision, with its own administrative unit due to its special significance or geographical location. These cities were Saint Petersburg, Moscow, Odessa, Sevastopol, Kyakhta, Feodosiya, Izmail, Derbent, Rostov-on-Don, Dalniy, Baku, Taganrog, Yalta, Kerch-Yenikale and Nikolayev.

The gradonachalnik was either personally appointed by the emperor or by recommendation of the Ministry of Internal Affairs. Compared to the cities that were subordinated to governorates, gradonachalniki enjoyed full rights to oversee city self-government (city police administration, supervision of trade, mail, shipping and public, serf and port buildings).

The gradonachalnik presided over special city affairs and over the provincial administrative committee when considering cases relating to economic orders in the capital.

Gradonachalniki of Odessa, Kerch-Yenikale and Sevastopol were in charge of matters concerning local police, trade and navigation (Charter of the City Planning Code, article 8o, Proceedings of 1886). In Sevastopol and Kerch-Yenikale, the posts of gradonachalniki were entrusted to admirals. In Sevastopol, the gradonachalnik was also a commandant and commander of the Sevastopol port.

The February Revolution of 1917 abolished the position of gradonachalnik, replacing the gradonachalniki with the commissars of the Provisional Government.

Bibliography

References 

Local government in the Russian Empire
Russian words and phrases